William Jackson Hicks (1827–1911) was a builder, architect and prison warden of North Carolina. He supervised a prison labor run brickworks and supplied bricks for use in the construction of a prison, other state buildings, and for use in private construction.

Works
Works of Hicks are listed on the U.S. National Register of Historic Places. These include:
Watts and Yuille Warehouses, 905 W. Main St. Durham, North Carolina (Hicks,W. J.), NRHP-listed
One or more works in Bright Leaf Historic District, roughly bounded by W. Peabody St., Duke St., Minerva Ave., N&W RR, Corporation St., Ligget St., Morris St. and W. Loop Durham, North Carolina (Hicks, William Jackson), NRHP-listed

References

External links 
 NCPedia: Hicks, William Jackson, Dictionary of North Carolina Biography
 William Jackson Hicks in Biographical history of North Carolina from colonial times to the present (1905)

Architects from North Carolina
1827 births
1911 deaths
American prison officials